Lee Dong-jun, Lee Dong-joon or Lee Dong-june may refer to:
 Lee Dong-jun (basketball) (born Daniel Sandrin, 1980), American-born South Korean basketball player
 Lee Dong-jun (footballer) (born 1997), South Korean footballer 
 Lee Dong-june (born 1967), South Korean composer